Heribert Rech (born April 25, 1950 in Östringen, Württemberg-Baden, West Germany) is a German lawyer and politician. Since 2004, he has been the Minister of the Interior in the German state of Baden-Württemberg.

Rech studied laws in Heidelberg. He is a widower and has two children.

Books
Rech, Heribert. Die Nachwirkung Freiwilliger Betriebsvereinbarungen : Auswirkungen der Beendigung einer freiwilligen Betriebsvereinbarung auf darin vorgesehene Ansprueche und Anwartschaften. (German lang.). January 1997. .

External links
 Council of Europe

See also
 Politics of Germany

1950 births
Living people
People from Karlsruhe (district)
Christian Democratic Union of Germany politicians
Members of the Landtag of Baden-Württemberg
Heidelberg University alumni